The final marked the first time the top two seeds contested the Australian Open final since 2004, in which Serena Williams defeated Maria Sharapova in straight sets with the score 6–3, 7–6(7–5) to win the women's singles tennis title at the 2015 Australian Open. It was her sixth Australian Open singles title and her 19th major singles title overall.

Li Na was the reigning champion, but she retired from professional tennis in September 2014.

All of the top four seeds (Williams, Sharapova, Simona Halep, and Petra Kvitová) were in contention for the world No. 1 ranking. Williams retained the top position by reaching the final.

Seeds

Qualifying

Wildcards

Draw

Finals

Top half

Section 1

Section 2

Section 3

Section 4

Bottom half

Section 5

Section 6

Section 7

Section 8

Championship match statistics

References 
General

Women drawsheet on ausopen.com

Specific

External links
 2015 Australian Open – Women's draws and results at the International Tennis Federation

Women's Singles
2015